Esenwein & Johnnson was an architectural firm of Buffalo, New York.

Firm history
It was a partnership of German-born August Esenwein (1856-1926) and James A. Johnson (1865-1939). The partnership was started in 1898; the firm designed "many of Buffalo's outstanding buildings including the Lafayette High School and the General Electric Building".
 

A number of their works are listed on the U.S. National Register of Historic Places.  In 2007, the Buffalo History Museum, then called the Buffalo and Erie County Historical Society, held an exhibition of their work entitled, "Art Nouveau and Other Expressions: Rediscovering the Architecture of Esenwein & Johnson."

Works
Works include (with attribution):
Ansonia Building (1906), 712-726 Main Street (at W. Tupper), Buffalo, New York (Esenwein & Johnson)
Automobile Club of Buffalo, 1910-1911, Clarence, New York (Esenwein & Johnson), NRHP-listed 
Bancroft Hotel, built 1912, 50 Franklin St. Worcester, Massachusetts (Esenwein & Johnson), NRHP-listed
Buffalo Museum of Science, built in 1929, (Esenwein & Johnson)
The Calumet (1906), 46-58 West Chippewa St., Buffalo, New York (Esenwein & Johnson), NRHP-listed
Colonial Flats and Annex, 399-401 Delaware Ave., Buffalo, New York. Designed the "Annex" (1900), (Esenwein & Johnson), NRHP-listed.
Dnipro Ukrainian Cultural Center, originally Fraternal Order of Orioles Headquarters (1914), 562 Genesee St., Buffalo New York (Esenwein & Johnson) 
The Durant, 607 E. 2nd Ave. Flint, Michigan (Esenwein & Johnson), NRHP-listed
Hotel Utica in Utica, New York
Iroquois Hotel in Buffalo, New York, Built 1889 and demolished in 1940 (known as the Gerrans Building at that time) 
Fosdick-Masten Park High School,aka Masten Park High School (1914), Masten Ave. and E. North St., Buffalo, New York (Esenwein & Johnson), NRHP-listed
General Electric Tower, aka Niagara-Mohawk Building and Electric Tower, 535 Washington St., Buffalo, New York (Esenwein & Johnson), NRHP-listed
Louis Kurtzman House (1907-1909), 24 Lincoln Parkway, Buffalo, New York (Esenwein & Johnson)
Lafayette High School, 370 Lafayette Ave., Buffalo, New York (Esenwein & Johnson), NRHP-listed
Hotel Lafayette (1902), 391 Washington St., Buffalo, New York (Esenwein & Johnson), NRHP-listed
Linde Air Products Factory (1910, 1911 Additions), 155 Chandler St., Buffalo, New York (Esenwein & Johnson), NRHP-listed
The Niagara, 201 Rainbow Blvd. Niagara Falls, New York (Esenwein and Johnson of Buffalo, NY), NRHP-listed
Portage Hotel, 10 N. Main St. Akron, Ohio (Esenwein & Johnson), NRHP-listed
Robert Keating Root Building (1912), 70-86 West Chippewa Street, Buffalo, New York (Esenwein & Johnson)
Sinclair, Rooney & Co. Building (1909-1911), 465 Washington St., Buffalo, New York, NRHP listed
John Sinclair House (1909-1911), 94 Jewett Parkway, Buffalo, New York (Esenwein & Johnson), part of the NRHP-listed Parkside East Historic District
Hotel Statler (original, c. 1908), Buffalo, New York (Esenwein & Johnson)
Taylor Signal Company-General Railway Signal Company (1902-1906), Buffalo, New York (Esenwein & Johnson)
Temple of Music (1901), Buffalo, New York (Esenwein & Johnson)
United Office Building (1929), 222 1st Street, Niagara Falls, New York (James A. Johnson), NRHP-listed
M. Wile and Company Factory Building, 77 Goodell St., Buffalo, New York (Esenwein & Johnson), NRHP-listed

A more complete list of works is found on the Buffalo Architecture and History web site.

Gallery

References

Defunct architecture firms based in New York (state)
Architects from Buffalo, New York
Companies based in Buffalo, New York
Design companies established in 1898
Design companies disestablished in 1930
1898 establishments in New York (state)
1930 disestablishments in New York (state)
Art Nouveau architects
Historicist architects

External links

 Esenwein & Johnson records 1891-1942: An inventory at EmpireADC.org, courtesy of the Buffalo History Museum.